Sardar Hasnain Bahadar Dreshak is a Pakistani politician who is the current Provincial Minister of Punjab for Livestock and Dairy Development, in office since 6 September 2018 till April 2022. He had been a member of the Provincial Assembly of the Punjab from August 2018 till January 2023.

Early life and education
He was born on 29 June 1974 to Sardar Nasrullah Khan Dreshak in Lahore, Pakistan.

He received degree of Bachelor of Science in Engineering (Electronics) in 1996 from the College of Electrical and Mechanical Engineering.

Political career
He was elected to the Provincial Assembly of the Punjab as an independent candidate from Constituency PP-248 (Rajanpur-II) in 2002 Pakistani general election. He received 28,070 votes and defeated Shahik Haider Khan Gorchani, a candidate of Pakistan Muslim League (N) (PML-N).

He was re-elected to the Provincial Assembly of the Punjab as a candidate of Pakistan Tehreek-e-Insaf (PTI) from Constituency PP-294 (Rajanpur-II) in 2018 Pakistani general election.

On 27 August 2018, he was inducted into the provincial Punjab cabinet of Chief Minister Sardar Usman Buzdar without any ministerial portfolio. On 6 September 2018, he was appointed as Provincial Minister of Punjab for livestock and dairy development.

In September 2018, a deputy commissioner from Rajanpur accused Dreshak, his brother and his father of illegally interfering in transfers and postings of members of Revenue Department and officials of the Border Military Police.

References

Living people
1974 births
Baloch politicians
Punjab MPAs 2002–2007
Punjab MPAs 2018–2023
Pakistan Muslim League (Q) MPAs (Punjab)
Pakistan Tehreek-e-Insaf MPAs (Punjab)
Sardar Hasnain
Provincial ministers of Punjab
National University of Sciences & Technology alumni